Esenler can refer to:

 Esenler
 Eşenler, Beyağaç
 Esenler, Kastamonu
 Esenler, Tarsus
 Esenler, Yüreğir
 Esenler Coach Terminal